Itumeleng Duiker (born 16 January 1972) is a Botswana former footballer who played as a midfielder. He played for the Botswana national football team between 1992 and 2000 and currently is the head coach of Extension Gunners in the Botswana Premier League.

Playing career
Duiker scored Botswana's lone goal in a 2-1 loss against Nigeria during the qualification for the 1994 FIFA World Cup. He also played a part in Extension Gunners three consecutive Botswana Premier League wins between 1992 and 1994.

Coaching career
As of 2018, Duiker is the head coach of Extension Gunners. He took over in 2017 as a caretaker manager but achieved good results and was given the full-time position.

Duiker also has managed the Botswana under-17s national team.

References

External links

Association football midfielders
Botswana footballers
Botswana expatriate footballers
Botswana international footballers
1972 births
Living people
Expatriate soccer players in South Africa
Extension Gunners FC players
Botswana expatriate sportspeople in South Africa
Dynamos F.C. (South Africa) players